is a railway station in the city of Inazawa, Aichi Prefecture, Japan, operated by Meitetsu.

Lines

Station layout
The station has a single island platform, which is connected to the station building by a level crossing.  The station has automated ticket machines, Manaca automated turnstiles and is staffed.

Platforms

Adjacent stations

|-
!colspan=5|Meitetsu

Station history
Marubuchi Station was opened on February 18, 1912 as a station on the privately held Bisai Railroad, which was purchased by Meitetsu on August 1, 1925 becoming the Meitetsu Bisai Line. The station has been unattended since March 1971.

Passenger statistics
In fiscal 2017, the station was used by an average of 830 passengers daily.

Surrounding area
Japan National Route 155

See also
 List of Railway Stations in Japan

References

External links

 Official web page 

Railway stations in Japan opened in 1912
Railway stations in Aichi Prefecture
Stations of Nagoya Railroad
Inazawa